F. C. Ballynure was an intermediate and junior-level football club in Northern Ireland. The club was formed in 2004 and played its home matches at Parkview Hockey Club in Doagh, County Antrim.

The club started off as Ballynure Young Men in junior football in the Boys Brigade Old Boys' Union League, moving to the junior section of the Ballymena & Provincial League in 2005. Intermediate status was achieved in 2008. However the club returned to the junior ranks in 2014 in order to join the Division 2C of the Northern Amateur Football League. The club did not complete the season however and in February 2015 announced their immediate disbandment.

References

External links
 F.C. Ballynure club web page (archived 2016)
 nifootball.co.uk - Fixtures, results and tables of Northern Ireland amateur football leagues (archived 2006)

Defunct association football clubs in Northern Ireland
Association football clubs in County Antrim
Association football clubs established in 2004
Association football clubs disestablished in 2015
2004 establishments in Northern Ireland
2015 disestablishments in Northern Ireland